Minnesota Golden Gophers  

Jacob Joseph Volkmann (born September 5, 1980) is an American mixed martial artist currently competing in the Welterweight division. A professional MMA competitor since 2007, Volkmann has formerly competed for the UFC, Bellator, and the World Series of Fighting.

Background
Volkmann was born in Fergus Falls, Minnesota and graduated from Henning High School. Volkmann wrestled for the Otter Tail Central Bulldogs and holds the schools all-time record for career wins and also won three state titles.
Volkmann then attended University of Minnesota, where he was a Big Ten Conference wrestling champion and a three time NCAA All-American. In 2001 as a freshman he finished fourth, then in 2003 as junior finished third (defeating future UFC Light Heavyweight Champion Rashad Evans), and then once again as a senior in 2004 finished fourth. After graduating from Minnesota, Volkmann attended the Northwestern Health and Science University in Bloomington, Minnesota where he earned his chiropractic doctorate and it was during this time that he also began competing in Greco-Roman wrestling at the senior level, and met UFC Lightweight Champion Sean Sherk through this program, who asked Volkmann to help train for a title fight. Volkmann later embarked on his own career in mixed martial arts.

Mixed martial arts career

Early career
Volkmann started his professional MMA career in 2007, primarily competing in Minnesota where he is a member of the Minnesota Martial Arts Academy.

At Bellator 7, Volkman made his lone Bellator appearance by defeating WEC and TUF vet, Kevin Knabjian with a D'arce choke.

Ultimate Fighting Championship
In August 2009, it was announced he would be making his Ultimate Fighting Championship debut at UFC 106 against Paulo Thiago. Volkmann lost the fight via unanimous decision.

Volkmann lost his second UFC fight (after taking it on short notice) against Martin Kampmann at UFC 108 via first round submission due to a modified guillotine choke dubbed the "death choke."

He received a third chance in the Octagon at UFC Fight Night: Florian vs. Gomi against Ronys Torres, in which Volkmann moved down to lightweight. Volkmann won the fight via split decision (28–29, 30–27, 30–27), earning his first UFC win.

Volkmann was scheduled to face Paul Kelly on July 3, 2010 at UFC 116. However, the fight was moved on August 1, to the UFC on Versus: Jones vs. Matyushenko card, due to visa issues for Kelly. Volkmann defeated Kelly via unanimous decision (30-27, 30-27, 30-27).

On October 2, 2010, it was announced that Volkmann would fight former MFC lightweight champion, Antonio McKee, at UFC 125. Volkmann won via split decision. After his bout at UFC 125, Volkmann said that he wanted to fight U.S. President Barack Obama because he disagreed with his policies and asserting, "Someone needs to knock some sense into that idiot."  That statement resulted in a visit from the U.S. Secret Service the following week. Volkmann has appeared on several national news shows for the comments, including The Tonight Show with Jay Leno, Inside Edition, and the Fox Business Network. Volkmann was also placed on administrative leave by White Bear Lake High School, where he is the assistant head coach of wrestling.

Volkmann next fought Danny Castillo on August 14, 2011 at UFC on Versus 5. The contest was mostly a grappling affair with Volkmann, on more than one occasion, threatening with a D'arce choke in all three rounds. He won the fight via unanimous decision (29-28 on all cards).

Volkmann was expected to face T. J. Grant on December 30, 2011 at UFC 141.  However, Grant was forced from the bout with an injury and replaced by Efrain Escudero. Volkmann controlled throughout the fight, dominating Escudero on the ground for rounds one and two. Volkmann won the fight via unanimous decision. He again made waves calling out U.S. President Barack Obama after the fight stating, "Obama needs a glassectomy...It's where they remove the belly button and put a piece of glass in there, so you can see what you're doing while your head's up your ass." The post-fight comments, again, got Volkmann placed on administrative leave by the White Bear Lake High School.

Volkmann was defeated by Paul Sass via first round submission due to a triangle armbar on May 26, 2012 at UFC 146.

Volkmann was expected to face Shane Roller on September 1, 2012 at UFC 151.  However, after UFC 151 was cancelled, Volkmann/Roller was rescheduled and took place on October 5, 2012 at UFC on FX 5. Volkmann took Roller down early in the fight and quickly took his back, forcing him to submit to a rear-naked choke at only 2:38 of the first round. This was Volkmann's first stoppage win since being in the UFC.

Volkmann faced promotional newcomer Bobby Green on February 2, 2013 at UFC 156. He lost the fight via submission in the third round. Following the loss, Volkmann was released from the promotion.

World Series of Fighting
A week after his UFC departure Volkmann was announced as the newest addition to the World Series of Fighting ranks.

Volkmann made his WSOF debut vs. Strikeforce vet Lyle Beerbohm at WSOF 3, on June 14. He won via unanimous decision. After the fight it emerged that Volkmann had suffered a seizure and blacked out before weigh-ins after becoming dehydrated from the weight-cut.

Other promotions
Volkmann defeated Danny White in a 165lb Catchweight bout at Dakota FC 18: Spring Brawl on April 26, 2014. He then faced UFC veteran T. J. O'Brien at Pinnacle Combat 16 on May 9, 2014. Volkmann lost the fight via guillotine choke.

He was set to make his debut in Maximum Fighting Championship against Andrew McInnes on October 3, 2014 at MFC 41. However, this fight never came to fruition and Volkmann didn't fight for the company.

Personal life
Volkmann has three children.  He is divorced. Volkmann is also a chiropractor and runs a clinic.

Championships and awards

Grappling
International Federation of Associated Wrestling Styles
World Champion (2008)
USA Grappling Midwest Regional Champion (2008)
USA Grappling National Champion (2008)
USA Grappling Runner Up (2009) (2010)

Collegiate wrestling
National Collegiate Athletic Association
NCAA Division I All-American out of University of Minnesota (2001), (2003), (2004)
NCAA Division I 174 1b - 4th place out of University of Minnesota (2001)
NCAA Division I 165 1b - 3rd place out of University of Minnesota (2003)
NCAA Division I 165 1b - 4th place out of University of Minnesota (2004)

Mixed martial arts
Victory Fighting Championship
VFC Welterweight Championship (One time)

Mixed martial arts record

|-
|Loss
|align=center|19–7
|Ben Saunders
|Submission (armbar)
|Fight Night at the Island
|
|align=center|1
|align=center|0:17
|Welch, Minnesota, United States
|
|-
|Win
|align=center|19–6
|Antonio Trócoli 
|Decision (unanimous)
|Legacy FC 51: Ramos vs. Vasquez
|
|align=center|3
|align=center|5:00
|Hinckley, Minnesota, United States
|
|-
|Win
|align=center|18–6
|Zak Ottow
|Technical Submission (D'Arce choke)
|Legacy FC 43: Larson vs. Krantz
|
|align=center|1
|align=center|4:55
|Hinckley, Minnesota, United States
|
|-
|Loss
|align=center|17–6
|T. J. O'Brien
|Submission (guillotine choke)
|Pinnacle Combat 16
|
|align=center|1
|align=center|2:14
|Dubuque, Iowa, United States
|
|-
|Win
|align=center|17–5
|Danny White
|TKO (elbows and punches)
|Dakota FC 18: Spring Brawl
|
|align=center|2
|align=center|3:45
|Fargo, North Dakota, United States
|
|-
|Loss
|align=center|16–5
|Luiz Firmino 
|Decision (unanimous)
|World Series of Fighting 6
|
|align=center|3
|align=center|5:00
|Coral Gables, Florida, United States
|
|-
|Win
|align=center|16–4
|Lyle Beerbohm 
|Decision (unanimous)
|World Series of Fighting 3
|
|align=center|3
|align=center|5:00
|Las Vegas, Nevada, United States
|
|-
|Loss
|align=center|15–4
|Bobby Green
|Submission (rear-naked choke)
|UFC 156
|
|align=center|3
|align=center|4:25
|Las Vegas, Nevada, United States
|
|-
|Win
|align=center|15–3
|Shane Roller
|Submission (rear-naked choke)
|UFC on FX: Browne vs. Bigfoot
|
|align=center|1
|align=center|2:38
|Minneapolis, Minnesota, United States
|
|-
|Loss
|align=center|14–3
|Paul Sass
|Submission (triangle armbar)
|UFC 146
|
|align=center|1
|align=center|1:54
|Las Vegas, Nevada, United States
|
|-
|Win
|align=center|14–2
|Efrain Escudero
|Decision (unanimous)
|UFC 141
|
|align=center|3
|align=center|5:00
|Las Vegas, Nevada, United States
|
|-
|Win
|align=center|13–2
|Danny Castillo
|Decision (unanimous)
|UFC Live: Hardy vs. Lytle
|
|align=center|3
|align=center|5:00
|Milwaukee, Wisconsin, United States
|
|-
|Win
|align=center|12–2
|Antonio McKee
|Decision (split)
|UFC 125
|
|align=center|3
|align=center|5:00
|Las Vegas, Nevada, United States
|
|-
|Win
|align=center|11–2
|Paul Kelly
|Decision (unanimous)
|UFC Live: Jones vs. Matyushenko
|
|align=center|3
|align=center|5:00
|San Diego, California, United States
|
|-
|Win
|align=center|10–2
|Ronys Torres
|Decision (split)
|UFC Fight Night: Florian vs. Gomi
|
|align=center|3
|align=center|5:00
|Charlotte, North Carolina, United States
|
|-
|Loss
|align=center|9–2
|Martin Kampmann
|Submission (guillotine choke)
|UFC 108
|
|align=center|1
|align=center|4:03
|Las Vegas, Nevada, United States
|
|-
|Loss
|align=center|9–1
|Paulo Thiago
|Decision (unanimous)
|UFC 106
|
|align=center|3
|align=center|5:00
|Las Vegas, Nevada, United States
|
|-
|Win
|align=center|9–0
|Kevin Knabjian
|Submission (D'arce choke)
|Bellator 7
|
|align=center|2
|align=center|1:42
|Chicago, Illinois, United States
|
|-
|Win
|align=center|8–0
|Bobby Voelker
|Decision (unanimous)
|Victory FC 25: Primetime
|
|align=center|5
|align=center|5:00
|Council Bluffs, Iowa, United States
|
|-
|Win
|align=center|7–0
|Steve Merth
|Submission (rear-naked choke)
|Brutaal Fight Night XIX
|
|align=center|1
|align=center|3:52
|Maplewood, Minnesota, United States
|
|-
|Win
|align=center|6–0
|Travis McCullough
|TKO (submission to strikes)
|Max Fights 4
|
|align=center|1
|align=center|0:51
|Fargo, North Dakota, United States
|
|-
| Win
|align=center|5–0
|Wayne Hajicek
|Submission (rear-naked choke)
|Max Fights 3
|
|align=center|1
|align=center|0:34
|Fargo, North Dakota, United States
|
|-
| Win
|align=center|4–0
|Brent Mehrhoff
|Decision (unanimous)
|Xtreme Fighting Organization 22
|
|align=center|3
|align=center|5:00
|Crystal Lake, Illinois, United States
|
|-
| Win
|align=center|3–0
|Caleb Wolff
|Submission (triangle choke)
|Brutaal Fight Night IV
|
|align=center|1
|align=center|N/A
|Maplewood, Minnesota, United States
|
|-
| Win
|align=center|2–0
|Nathan Oliver
|Decision (unanimous)
|Ultimate Combat Sports: Battle on the Bay 8
|
|align=center|N/A
|align=center|N/A
|Superior, Wisconsin, United States
|
|-
| Win
|align=center|1–0
|Chaylen Rader
|TKO (submission to strikes)
|Cage Fighting Xtreme 6
|
|align=center|1
|align=center|2:17
|Brainerd, Minnesota, United States
|

References

External links

Official UFC Profile
MMA Website | https://web.archive.org/web/20120531113218/http://www.jacobvolkmann.net/

1980 births
American male mixed martial artists
Living people
Mixed martial artists from Minnesota
Lightweight mixed martial artists
Welterweight mixed martial artists
Mixed martial artists utilizing collegiate wrestling
Mixed martial artists utilizing Greco-Roman wrestling
People from Fergus Falls, Minnesota
American male sport wrestlers
Minnesota Golden Gophers wrestlers
Ultimate Fighting Championship male fighters